Petrophila cappsi is a moth in the family Crambidae. It was described by William Harry Lange in 1956. It is found in North America, where it has been recorded from Arizona.

References

Petrophila
Moths described in 1956